Bangladesh Botanical Society is a national non-profit organisation that supports botanical research in Bangladesh. It provides scholarships to botany students in Bangladesh. It is located in the Department of Botany, University of Dhaka, Bangladesh.

History
Bangladesh Botanical Society was established in 1972. It started publishing the Bangladesh Journal of Botany in 1972 biannually. The society is funded by the Ministry of Science and Technology. The first president of the society was A. M. Eunus of the University of Rajshahi. The first secretary general of the society was M. A. Hannan of the Atomic Energy Centre, Dhaka. The first editor of Bangladesh Journal of Botany was Ahmad Shamsul Islam of the University of Dhaka. In 1986 the society started the publication Udvid Barta which was a Bengali language botany journal. In February 2017, Bangladesh Botanical Society and the Biology Faculty of Chittagong University held the first Botanical Olympiad in Bangladesh at the Chittagong University. Another Botanical Olympiad was held at Chittagong University in October 2017.

References

Research institutes in Bangladesh
1972 establishments in Bangladesh
Organisations based in Dhaka
Botanical societies
Flora of Bangladesh
Learned societies of Bangladesh
Scientific organizations established in 1972
Charities based in Bangladesh
Scientific organisations based in Bangladesh